The orthography used to write Northern Sámi has experienced numerous changes since the first writing systems for the language were developed. Traditionally, Norway, Sweden, and Finland — the three countries where Northern Sámi is spoken — used separate orthographies for teaching the Sámi within their borders. This changed in 1979 when a Saami Council-led effort to standardize a pan-Scandinavian orthography for Northern Sámi.

The roots of the current orthography for Northern Sámi were laid by Danish linguist Rasmus Rask, who, after discussions with Norwegian cleric Nils Vibe Stockfleth, published in 1832 Ræsonneret lappisk sproglære efter den sprogart, som bruges af fjældlapperne i Porsangerfjorden i Finmarken: En omarbejdelse af Prof. Knud Leems Lappiske grammatica (Reasonable Lappish Language Learning According to the Language Used by the Mountain Lapps in the Porsangerfjord in Finnmark: A recast of Prof. Knud Leem's Lappian Grammar). Rask established an orthography based on the principle of a single grapheme for each sound, i.e., it should be a phonemic orthography. All the Northern Sámi orthographies developed since 1832 trace their roots back to Rask's system. This means diacritics are used with some consonants (č, đ, ŋ, š, ŧ and ž), which caused data-processing problems before Unicode was introduced.

In 2006, Norwegian seventh grade students began to be taught the Northern Sámi alphabet as part of their lessons.

The various orthographies
The region in parentheses following the name of the orthography or its inventor is where the orthography was used. It was only in 1979 that Norway, Sweden, and Finland had a common orthography for Northern Sámi.

 Knud Leem (Norway)
 Nils Vibe Stockfleth (Norway)
 J.A. Friis (Norway)
 Konrad Nielsen (in scientific works throughout the 20th century)
 Paavo Ravila (1934) (Finland)
 Erkki Itkonen (1951) (Finland)
 Bergsland–Ruong orthography (Norway, Sweden)
 1979 orthography (Norway, Sweden, Finland)

Background
Four main points were considered in launching new orthographies for Northern Sámi:
 Knowing in principle the details of the orthography
 Recognizing the linguistic changes that affect Northern Sámi
 Selecting which dialect to use for the Northern Sámi literary language
 Considering the Northern Sámi spelling in other countries

A common joke, although one with a grain of truth, is that the Northern Sámi orthography changed each time the professor of Sámi languages changed at the University of Oslo, i.e., with Nils Vibe Stockfleth, J. A. Friis, Konrad Nielsen, Knut Bergsland, and Ole Henrik Magga. However, this generalization is no longer true as the 1979 orthography was the result of a collective effort by Sámi from all three countries where Northern Sámi is spoken, working together to reach a consensus over a ten-year period.

The Leem/Rask orthography
The alphabet used by Rask in Ræsonneret lappisk sproglære (1832) aimed to use a single grapheme for each sound.

The Stockfleth orthography

Inspired by his conversations with Rask, Nils Vibe Stockfleth published a Sami grammar in 1837 that used several unique letters, including C̀ c̀ (tshje) and S̀ s̀ (eshi), as well as ǥ (gh), ƞ (engh), ʒ (eds), and ʒ̀ (edshi), which appeared only in lowercase forms.

The Friis orthography
The Friis orthography was used in the Sámi version of the Bible published in 1895, as well as by the Sámi newspaper Muitalægje and Nuorttanaste, a religious publication of the Lapp Mission, which was first published in 1898. The one thing that sets the Friis orthography apart from the other orthographies used to write the various Sámi languages is that it is the one the greatest number of Sámi have learned over the past 100 years. It uses the same alphabet as Stockfleth did in Abes ja låkkam-girje with the elimination of the vowel Å å.

J.A. Friis starting working on translating the Bible into Northern Sámi as Stockfleth had only managed to translate the New Testament. In his translation work, Friis was notably assisted by people who spoke Northern Sámi as their mother tongue. In 1854, Friis was joined by Hans Jacobsen Hætta, who had been previously jailed in Kristiania following the Sami revolt in Guovdageaidnu. In 1874, their reworked version of Stockfleth's New Testament in Northern Sámi was published. Friis went on to also publish the Old Testament in cooperation with Lars Hætta and Norwegian linguist Just Knud Qvigstad in 1895. Qvigstad modified the Friis orthography to use an apostrophe to mark strong and extra strong consonants.

The Nielsen orthography
Konrad Nielsen developed his orthography for use in his dictionary and textbooks. This orthography is still used when quoting examples of Northern Sámi in international Finno-Ugric works.

Vowels
The following table shows the correspondence between the vowels used in Nielsen's orthography and in the orthography approved in 1979.

The Ravila orthography
Also, referred to as the Sámi Čuvgehussearvi orthography, was developed by Paavo Ravila in (1934) and was aligned to Finnish orthographic conventions, for example using p, k, and t instead of b, g, and d. It was modified in 1951 by Erkki Itkonen and continued to be used for Northern Sámi in Finland until 1979.

The Bergsland-Ruong orthography
The Bergsland-Ruong orthography was developed by Knut Bergsland and Israel Ruong and was in use from 1948 to 1978 in Norway and Sweden. Only about 100 books were published in Norway using this orthography. The Nordic Sámi Institute journal Dieđut was originally published as Dieđot using the Bergsland-Ruong orthography.

The 1979 orthography
In 1979, the Saami Council approved a new pan-Scandinavian orthography for Northern Sámi, marking the first time a single writing system would be used in Norway, Sweden, and Finland. It quickly replaced previous orthographies. Minor revisions were made to the orthography in 1985.

Examples of the various orthographies for Northern Sámi 

Extracts of text from the New Testament, Matthew 12:1-8.

English version (King James Version, Matthew chapter 12, verses 1-8)
At that time Jesus went on the sabbath day through the corn; and his disciples were an hungred, and began to pluck the ears of corn, and to eat. But when the Pharisees saw it, they said unto him, Behold, thy disciples do that which is not lawful to do upon the sabbath day. But he said unto them, Have ye not read what David did, when he was an hungred, and they that were with him; How he entered into the house of God, and did eat the shewbread, which was not lawful for him to eat, neither for them which were with him, but only for the priests? Or have ye not read in the law, how that on the sabbath days the priests in the temple profane the sabbath, and are blameless? But I say unto you, That in this place is one greater than the temple. But if ye had known what this meaneth, I WILL HAVE MERCY, AND NOT SACRIFICE, ye would not have condemned the guiltless. For the Son of man is Lord even of the sabbath day.

Nils Vibe Stockfleth 1840

J.A. Friis 1874 (reworked by J.Qvigstad for the 1895 version of the Bible)

Konrad Nielsen orthography

Bergsland-Ruong orthography (1948)

1979 orthography

References

Northern Sámi
Languages of Norway
Languages of Sweden
Languages of Finland
Sámi orthography